Admiral Hughes may refer to:

Charles Frederick Hughes (1866–1934), U.S. Navy admiral
Edward Hughes (Royal Navy officer) (c. 1720–1794), British Royal Navy admiral
Jeffrey W. Hughes (born 1966), U.S. Navy vice admiral
Sir Richard Hughes, 2nd Baronet (c. 1729–1812), British Royal Navy admiral

See also
Charles Hughes-Hallett (1898–1985), British Royal Navy vice admiral
John Hughes-Hallett (1901–1972), British Royal Navy vice admiral